Penstemon palmeri, known by the common name Palmer's penstemon, is a species of perennial flowering plant in the genus Penstemon that is notable for its showy, rounded flowers, and for being one of the few scented penstemons. The plant, in the family Plantaginaceae, is named after the botanist Edward Palmer.

Distribution
Penstemon palmeri is native to desert mountains from the eastern Mojave Desert in California, to eastern Nevada, northeastern Arizona, and New Mexico, and north through areas in Utah, Colorado, Wyoming, Idaho, and eastern Washington.

Penstemon palmeri is a drought-tolerant perennial plant, preferring well draining drier soils.

Description
Penstemon palmeri, Palmer's penstemon, grows erect and may reach  height. The leaves are generally oppositely arranged and have toothed margins. The inflorescence is a panicle or raceme with small bracts.

The flower has a five-lobed calyx of sepals and a cylindrical corolla which may have an expanded throat. The staminode is partially hairy. The showy, rounded flower has large pink to violet to blue-purple petals and is fragrant, which distinguishes it from other, similar-looking penstemon. Occasional specimens are red, yellow, or white flowered.

Varieties
There are three Penstemon palmeri varieties: 
Penstemon palmeri var. palmeri - Palmer's penstemon, most occurrences of this species are this variety.
Penstemon palmeri var. macranthus - scented beardtongue, is endemic to the Great Basin Desert in Nevada
Penstemon palmeri var. eglandulosus - scented beardtongue, is limited to Utah and Arizona

Ecology
It is evergreen, and it is a larval host to both the Arachne checkerspot and the variable checkerspot.

References

External links

Jepson Manual Treatment: Penstemon palmeri var. palmeri
Penstemon palmeri - Photo gallery

palmeri
Flora of the Western United States
Flora of Nevada
Flora of Utah
Flora of Arizona
Flora of New Mexico
Flora of Wyoming
Flora of Colorado
Flora of Washington (state)
North American desert flora
Flora of the Great Basin
Flora of the California desert regions
Natural history of the Mojave Desert
Flora without expected TNC conservation status